Barira, officially the Municipality of Barira (Maguindanaon: Ingud nu Barira; Iranun: Inged a Barira), is a 4th class municipality in the province of Maguindanao del Norte, Philippines. According to the 2020 census, it has a population of 36,143 people.

Barira was established on August 29, 1977, through Presidential Decree No. 1188 signed by then President Ferdinand Marcos from the municipality of Buldon.

The town was part of the province of Shariff Kabunsuan from October 2006 until its nullification by the Supreme Court in July 2008.

Geography

Barangays

Barira is politically subdivided into 14 barangays.
 Barira (Poblacion)
 Bualan
 Gadung
 Korosoyan
 Lamin
 Liong
 Lipa
 Lipawan
 Marang
 Nabalawag
 Panggao
 Rominimbang
 Togaig
 Minabay

Climate

Demographics

Economy

References

External links
 Barira Profile at the DTI Cities and Municipalities Competitive Index
 [ Philippine Standard Geographic Code]
 Philippine Census Information
 Local Governance Performance Management System

Municipalities of Maguindanao del Norte
Establishments by Philippine presidential decree